Ambalabe Airport is an airport in Antsohihy, Sofia Region, Madagascar .

References

Airports in Madagascar
Sofia Region